Douglas Moore is a New Zealand former football manager.

Managerial career
After managing the Singapore national football team between 1994 and 1995, Moore became the chief executive of the Singapore Premier League. He returned to management in 1998 with Geylang United.

References

External links
 Douglas Moore at National-Football-Teams.com

Date of birth unknown
Living people
Singapore national football team managers
Geylang International FC head coaches
New Zealand expatriate sportspeople in Singapore
Expatriate football managers in Singapore
New Zealand association football coaches
Year of birth missing (living people)